Arthur William "Dutch" Schult (June 20, 1928 – July 25, 2014) was an American professional baseball player. Schult was an outfielder and first baseman who played in 164 games over five seasons for the New York Yankees, Cincinnati Redlegs, Washington Senators and the Chicago Cubs.

Schult was born in Brooklyn, New York. He attended Georgetown University and was signed by the Yankees as an amateur free agent in 1948. He played for ten seasons in minor league baseball, hitting 136 home runs. However, he spent only one full season in the Majors— with Cincinnati (21 games) and Washington (77 games)—hitting a personal MLB career-high four homers and knocking in 39 runs. His 111 career big-league hits included 24 doubles as well as six homers. He retired after the 1960 campaign.

Schult died on July 25, 2014 at the age of 86.

References

External links

1928 births
2014 deaths
Baseball players from New York (state)
Binghamton Triplets players
Chicago Cubs players
Cincinnati Redlegs players
Houston Buffs players
Kansas City Blues (baseball) players
Major League Baseball first basemen
Major League Baseball outfielders
Minneapolis Millers (baseball) players
New York Yankees players
Newark Bears (IL) players
Norfolk Tars players
Seattle Rainiers players
Sportspeople from Brooklyn
Baseball players from New York City
Syracuse Chiefs players
Washington Senators (1901–1960) players
White Plains High School alumni